Cameron Paul Jacques Peupion (born 23 September 2002) is an Australian soccer player who plays as a midfielder for the academy of Brighton & Hove Albion and the Australia under-23 national team.

Club career
Peupion started his career with A-League club Sydney FC youth side Sydney FC Youth.

Brighton & Hove Albion
In 2020, he joined the youth academy of Brighton & Hove Albion in the English Premier League.

Peupion made his debut for Brighton on 24 August 2022, coming on as an 80th minute substitute replacing fellow debutant Julio Enciso and assisting Evan Ferguson's first Albion goal in the 3–0 away win over League One side Forest Green Rovers in the EFL Cup second round.

International career
Peupion represented Australia at the 2019 FIFA U-17 World Cup and at the 2022 AFC U-23 Asian Cup. He is eligible to represent France internationally.

Career statistics

References

External links
 

2002 births
Association football midfielders
Australia youth international soccer players
Australian expatriate soccer players
Australian expatriate sportspeople in England
Australian soccer players
Australian people of French descent
Expatriate footballers in England
Living people